Hallmark Movies Now (formerly called Feeln and originally SpiritClips) is an on-demand streaming video service that offers family-friendly movies, documentaries and short films. The company was founded in 2007 by Academy Award-winning producer Robert N. Fried. Hallmark Movies Now is owned by Hallmark Cards and based out of Los Angeles.

History
Hallmark Movies Now was founded in 2007 as SpiritClips. The company was started by Robert N. Fried, a film producer and studio executive who has produced movies such as Rudy and Hoosiers. Fried created SpiritClips as a collection of family-friendly and inspirational films.

In April 2012, SpiritClips was acquired by Hallmark Cards, the largest greeting card manufacturer in the United States. Prior to the acquisition, SpiritClips had been working with Hallmark as the official provider for Hallmark's Hall of Fame series of inspirational films. In September 2014, the company was rebranded as Feeln. 

On October 3, 2017, the service was relaunched as Hallmark Movies Now. In November 2017, the service was available on Amazon Channels. Movies Now first original series, When Hope Calls, a spin-off of Hallmark Channel’s When Calls the Heart, debuted in August 2019.

Operations
Hallmark Movies Now is an on-demand video streaming service similar to Netflix that provides movies, documentaries, and short films that are suitable for all audiences, specifically families. Hallmark Movies Now also edits films that do not have content suitable for all ages to have a PG rating, similar to how films are edited to be shown on cable TV.

Along with iOS, Android, Roku and Amazon Fire and Channels, Crown Media is offering the streaming services to its existing multichannel video-programming distributors.

Programming
Hallmark Movies Now's programming consists of 800 and 1,000 hours not on the linear Hallmark channels. Seasons one and two of Chesapeake Shores were available via the service while season three was on Hallmark Channel in the summer 2018.

Original TV programming

See also
List of Hallmark Channel Original Movies
List of Hallmark Hall of Fame episodes

Notes

References

Video on demand services
Internet properties established in 2007
IOS software
Android (operating system) software
Universal Windows Platform apps
Hallmark Cards